João Carlos Gonçalves Filho (born 9 November 1983), known as Nenê, is a Brazilian futsal player who plays as a pivot.

Career
Born in São Paulo, Nenê arrived in European futsal at the hands of Sporting CP coach, Paulo Fernandes. He spent three years there, winning one league in his first year, and two Portuguese cups in the remaining two.

In 2008, he left Sporting and moved to the Russian league, joining MFK CSKA Moscow, without winning any silverware. He then spent two years at Nacional Zagreb, winning both a league and a national cup.

After one year in Belgium, at Action 21, Paulo Fernandes, now at Benfica, brought him to the club on 28 July 2012. In Lisbon, he only won one supercup over two seasons, so he was released on 19 June 2014, together with Joel Queirós and Marcão. Afterwards, he played with Serbian club KMF Ekonomac Kragujevac, and Cypriot clube APOEL.

Honours
Sporting CP
 Liga Portuguesa de Futsal: 2005–06
 Taça de Portugal de Futsal: 2005–06, 2007–08

Nacional Zagreb
Croatian Prva HMNL: 2009–10

SL Benfica
SuperTaça de Futsal de Portugal: 2012

Ekonomac
Serbian Prva Futsal Liga: 2015

References

1983 births
Living people
Sportspeople from São Paulo
Brazilian men's futsal players
Sporting CP futsal players
S.L. Benfica futsal players
Brazilian expatriates in Portugal
Brazilian expatriates in Russia
Brazilian expatriate sportspeople in Croatia
Brazilian expatriate sportspeople in Belgium
Brazilian expatriates in Serbia